Ittar, also known as attar, is an essential oil derived from botanical or other natural sources. Most commonly these oils are extracted via hydro or steam distillation. The Persian physician 
Ibn Sina was first to derive the attar of flowers from distillation. Attar can also be expressed by chemical means but generally natural perfumes which qualify as ittars are distilled with water.

The oils are generally distilled into a wood base such as sandalwood and then aged. The aging period can last from one to ten years depending on the botanicals used and the results desired.

Technically ittars are distillates of flowers, herbs, spices and other natural materials such as baked soil over sandalwood oil/liquid paraffins using hydro distillation technique involving a still and receiving vessel. These techniques are still in use today at Kannauj in India.

History
The word 'attar', 'ittar' or 'itra' is believed to have been derived from the Persian word , which is in turn derived from the Arabic word , meaning 'perfume'.

The earliest recorded mention of the techniques and methods used to produce essential oils is believed to be that of Ibn al-Baitar (1188–1248), an Al-Andalusian (Muslim Iberia) physician, pharmacist and chemist.

The Egyptians were famous for producing perfumes throughout the ancient world. They were formulated from plants and flowers before they could be added to other oils. It was later refined and developed by al-Shaykh al-Rais, a renowned physician who made a distinctive type of aromatic product. He was referred to as Abi Ali al Sina. He was among the first people to come with the technique of distillation of roses and other plant fragrances. Liquid perfumes used to be a mixture of oil and crushed herbs until his discovery where he first experimented with roses.

In Yemen, a special variety of ittar was introduced by Arwa al-Sulayhi, the Yemeni Queen. This type of Attar was prepared from mountainous flowers and given as a gift to the monarchs of Arabia.

Abul Fazal Faizee gives another verdict of how Attar was used to making the Mabkhara-incense-burner. The barks that were used in Akbar's time according to Faizee were aloe, sandalwood, and cinnamon. Animal substances such as myrrh, musk, and anbar were used along with roots of special trees and a few other spices. The ruler of Awadh, Ghazi-ud-Din Haidar Shah used to prepare fountains of ittar around his bedroom. These fountains would create a very pleasant fragrant and romantic atmosphere by functioning continuously.

Uses and types
Ittars are generally classified based on their perceived effect on the body. 'Warm' ittars such as musk, amber and kesar (saffron) are used in winter, as they are believed to increase body temperature. Likewise, 'cool' ittars such as rose, jasmine, khus, kewda and mogra are used in summers for their perceived cooling effect on the body.

Although ittars are mostly used as a perfume, they are also used for medicinal and aphrodisiacal purposes.

Musk
Musk is a class of aromatic compound produced by Moschus moschiferus, a rare species of the male deer found in the Himalayas. The substance used in creating musk can only be produced by a mature male Moschus, and the process of acquiring it involves killing the deer. As such, its demand has led to the endangerment of most musk deer species, which in turn has aided the rise of synthetic musk, known as 'white musk'.

Natural musk is commonly mixed with medicines and confectionary. Purported medicinal benefits range from working as an antivenom and strengthening organs.

Ambergris
Ambergris, also known as Anbar, is a waxy substance excreted by the sperm whale and retrieved from beaches and the sea. It is thought to have been used by humans for at least 1,000 years, and has a musky aroma. Ambrein, an alcohol used as a scent preservative, is extracted from ambergris.

Spirituality and religion
For hundreds of years, ittars were considered in some societies, mainly in Islamic cultural folk to be something that attracted angels and warded off evil spirits. Sufi saints and spiritual aspirants would adorn themselves with these scents to assist them in their journey towards enlightenment.

The different sects of Hinduism worship deities through household and temple offerings and Sufis in Islamic shrines and sacred khanqah's. Ittars are commonly used within the incense and food used as offerings.

See also
Attar of roses
Bṛhat Saṃhitā
Charaka Samhita
Essential oil
Kannauj Perfume
List of essential oils
Varahamihira

References

Further reading
Chemical Industries in India by H. E. Watson Industrial & Engineering Chemistry Volume 18, Issue 7, Year 1926, Pages 748 - 752.
Buchanan's account of the manufacture of rose-water and other perfumes at Patna in A.D. 1811 and its bearing on the history of Indian perfumery industry, by P. K. Gode, New Indian Antiquary 7, 181–185; also in: SICH I (1961), 36–42, Year 1946.
Studies in the history of Indian cosmetics and perfumery: Notes on the history of the rose, rose-water and attar of roses—Between B.C. 500 and A.D. 1850 by P. K. Gode, New Indian Antiquary 8, 107–119; also in: SICH I (1961), 15–35 Year 1946.
Studies in Indian Cultural History, by P.K.Gode,  Vol. I, Year 1961, Hoshiarpur.
A useful pathological condition of wood by M. Jalaluddin Economic Botany, Volume 31, Issue 2, April 1977, Pages 222–224.
Perfumery in ancient India by Krishnamurthy R Indian J Hist Sci., Volume 22, Issue 1, Jan 1987, Pages 71–79.
Attars of India – A Unique Aroma by J. N. Kapoor Perfumer & Flavorist Jan/Feb 1991, Pages 21–24.
Indian attars by Christopher Mcmohan International Journal of Aromatherapy, Volume 7, Issue 4, Year 1996, Pages 10–13.
India Where Attars Originated by Omprakash Yemul India Perspectives, March 2004 Page 40.
Traditional system for the production of kewda essential oil and attar by D K Mohapatra & S Sahoo Indian Journal of traditional Knowledge, Vol 6(3), July 2007 Pages 399–402.
Traditional method of Chuli oil extraction in Ladakh by Deepa H Dwivedi & Sanjai K Dwivedi Indian Journal of traditional Knowledge, Vol 6(3), July 2007, Pages 403–405.
Ecology and traditional technology of screw pine perfume industry in coastal Orissa by Deenabandhu Sahu & Malaya Kumar Misra  Indian Journal of traditional Knowledge, Vol 6(3), July 2007.
Kewda Perfume Industry in India 1 by P. K. Dutta, H. O. Saxena and M. Brahmam  Economic Botany, Vol 41(3), July 1987, Pages 403–410.
Rose cultivation for Attar production in Bulgaria [manufacturing of Scent] by Rai B.  Indian Horticulture (India) Vol 29(4), Mar 1985, Pages 13–18.
Material that is old and new (No.28). Present and past of perfumeby OE HIDEFUSA  Expected Materials for the Future Volume 3, No 5, Year 2003, Pages 66–71.
Parisrut the earliest distilled liquor of Vedic times or of about 1500 B.C. by Mahdihassan S.  Indian J Hist Sci. volume 16 Issue 2, Nov 1981, Pages 223–229.
A brief history of Indian alchemy covering pre-Vedic to Vedic and Ayurvedic period (circa 400 B.C.-800 A.D.). by Ali M.  Bull Indian Inst Hist Med Hyderabad Volume 23, Issue 2, Jul 1993, Pages 151 - 166.
Indian Alchemy: its Origin and Ramifications. In Chemistry and Chemical Techniques in India (Ed.) Subbarayappa, B.V., Delhi: Centre for Studies in Civilizations Year 1999.
History of Chemistry and Alchemy in India from Pre-historic to Pre- Modern Times. In History of Indian Science and Technology an Culture AD 1000–1800 (Ed) A. Rahman. Year 1998. Oxford.
Preparation and Testing of Perfume as described in Brhatsamhita Sachin A Mandavgane, P P Holey and J Y Deopujari Indian Journal of Traditional Knowledge Vol 8(2), April 2009 Page 275–277.
Dragoco Report. Dr Paolo Rovesti. Year 1975.

Perfumes
Indian culture
Desi culture